St Cyres School is an 11–18 mixed, English-medium, community secondary school and sixth form in Penarth, Vale of Glamorgan, Wales. It was established in 1958.

Until June 2012, the school was split over two sites: the larger site at Penarth, and a smaller lower school (years 7 to 9) in the nearby village of Dinas Powys. The school has since been unified and moved into a new site, in the Penarth Learning Community.

History 
The school has had three names in its short history: St Cyres Secondary Modern School, St Cyres Comprehensive School, and now, St Cyres School. The school was established in 1958 and celebrated its 50th anniversary year during the Autumn term of 2008. Several special events took place marking the anniversary.

Between 1958 and 1968 the school roll was bolstered by children from Radyr on the other side of Cardiff as it was quicker and easier for them to travel the nine miles by train to Penarth and attend either St Cyres Secondary Modern or Penarth Grammar School, than it was to walk or drive to nearer Cardiff schools. The arrangement only ceased when the direct rail link was removed by the Beeching axe.

Buildings 

The Penarth Site was divided into five parts, each built at different times: the Old Block, the Annexe, the New Block, the Terrapins, and the Science Block. The Penarth Site's 'New Block' (which housed the sciences, mathematics, geography, and the Sixth Form) was considered to be the highest vantage point in Penarth.

Planning approval was granted in September 2012 to redevelop St Cyres and amalgamate it with two nearby special schools (Ysgol Er'w Delyn, Ashgrove) and Barry’s Ysgol Maes Dyfan. Work was expected to be completed by the end of 2014.

The proposals were to cost £48 million plan and would see the transformation of the St Cyres site into a brand new learning campus, incorporating St Cyres School on a single site.  Completion would see the school reunited on the single Penarth site with the Dinas Powys lower school being closed.

Penarth Learning Community 
The Penarth Learning community is a key element to the schools investment program with the funding scheme provided by the Welsh Government and Vale of Glamorgan Council under the Government's 21st century program.

The site is located on the western edge of Penarth and the new build spreads onto the old St Cyres playing fields. The two schools (St Cyres School, and the SEN school) are accommodated within one building. St Cyres holds a larger section of the building, with 11,851 sqm, and the SEN school a gross internal area of 7,942 sqm.

Fairtrade school 
In 2008, St Cyres was granted "Fairtrade status" by Fair Trade Wales and became the first secondary school in Penarth to be so recognised. It was also one of the first Fairtrade schools in the Principality. Penarth has been a "Fairtrade Town" since 2006. The school has a long-standing link with the Penarth Town Fairtrade Forum and its support was recognised when Penarth became the first Fairtrade Town in the area. The school has a teacher and pupil representatives as members. The pupils who run the Fairtrade scheme in the school were recognised in October 2009 by the award of the national Diana Award for Excellence.

Shares4Schools 
St Cyres School was the only school in Wales that took part in the Shares4Schools investment competition, using real funds, amongst 84 schools in the rest of the UK.

The competition started in October 2007 and ran until June 2008, organised and partially sponsored by The Share Centre. Schools taking part had to initially raise £1,500 as their investment funds.

Cyres Sound 
On 19 September 2011, St Cyres school launched its own 24-hour internet radio station, Cyres Sound. The idea was conceived by ex- Real Radio Wales Richard 
Hopkin, who is now a music teacher at the school. During school hours, pupils run their own live shows, pre-recorded shows are broadcast in the evening and weekends, including educational programmes produced by teachers. The genre of music is Pop/Rock although specialist shows are also broadcast.

Curriculum

Welsh Baccalaureate 
St Cyres has been one of the leading pioneer centres for the introduction and development of the Welsh Baccalaureate Qualification and was one of the first schools to offer the course at Advanced Level (A Level) in Wales. St Cyres was also one of the first schools to offer the qualification at Intermediate level (GCSE).

School badge 
The school badge consists of a quartered shield depicting:

 A Castle Keep (relating to the Dinas Powys castle)
 A Celtic Cross (relating to the Welsh national symbol)
 A Welsh Harp (relating to Erw'r Delyn – the "Field of the Harp" – the original shape of the land)
 A Welsh Dragon (relating to the Welsh symbol)

Notable alumni 
 David Davies, swimmer
 Tanni Grey-Thompson, politician, television presenter and former wheelchair racer
 Jamie Ringer, rugby union player

Notable staff 
 Brian Lightman, former headmaster
 Audrey Evelyn Jones, former staff member and deputy headteacher

References

External links 
 

Fair trade schools
Buildings and structures in Penarth
Secondary schools in the Vale of Glamorgan
Educational institutions established in 1958
1958 establishments in Wales